Anton Stabrovskyy (Ukrainian: Антон Стабровський) is a Paralympic swimmer from Ukraine competing mainly in category S12 events.

Anton was part of the Ukrainian team for the 2008 Summer Paralympics in Beijing.  He competed in the  individual medley and  freestyle finishing last in his heat in both events, he also finished third in the  butterfly to earn a bronze medal.

Personal life
Stabrovskyy is married with Maryna.

References

External links
 

Paralympic swimmers of Ukraine
Swimmers at the 2008 Summer Paralympics
Swimmers at the 2012 Summer Paralympics
Paralympic bronze medalists for Ukraine
Ukrainian male butterfly swimmers
Ukrainian male freestyle swimmers
Living people
S12-classified Paralympic swimmers
Year of birth missing (living people)
Medalists at the 2008 Summer Paralympics
Medalists at the World Para Swimming European Championships
Paralympic medalists in swimming
21st-century Ukrainian people